Stop at a Winner is a 1961 comedy novel by the British writer R.F. Delderfield. It follows the misadventures of two RAF men during the Second World War, the gentle giant Pedlar Pascoe and the conniving Horace Pop, a Londoner who has attempted to avoid conscription.

Adaptation
It was adapted into the British film On the Fiddle directed by Cyril Frankel, with the lead roles played by Sean Connery and Alfred Lynch.

References

Bibliography
 Sternlicht, Sanford. R.F. Delderfield. Twayne Publishers, 1988.

1961 British novels
British comedy novels
Novels by R. F. Delderfield
Novels set in England
Novels set in the 1940s
British novels adapted into films
Novels set during World War II
Hodder & Stoughton books